Samuel Joseph Byck (January 30, 1930 – February 22, 1974) was an American hijacker and attempted assassin. On February 22, 1974, he attempted to hijack a plane flying out of Baltimore/Washington International Airport, intending to crash into the White House in the hopes of killing President Richard Nixon. During the incident, Byck killed a policeman and a pilot, but was shot and wounded by another policeman before committing suicide.

Early life 
Born to poor Jewish parents in South Philadelphia, Byck dropped out of high school in the ninth grade in order to support his impoverished family. He enlisted in the U.S. Army in 1954 and was honorably discharged in 1956. He married shortly thereafter, and fathered four children.

Background 
In 1972, Byck began to suffer from severe bouts of depression after his wife divorced him and several job-related financial failures. He admitted himself to a psychiatric ward, for a two-month stay. Byck began to harbor the belief that the Nixon administration was conspiring to oppress the poor.

Byck came to the notice of the Secret Service in 1972, when he threatened Nixon, whom he had resented since the Small Business Administration had turned down his loan application. Byck had also sent tape recordings to various other public figures including scientist Jonas Salk, Senator Abraham Ribicoff of Connecticut, and composer Leonard Bernstein; and had tried to join the Black Panthers. The Secret Service considered Byck to be harmless, and no action was taken at that time.

Assassination attempt 

In early 1974, Byck made his decision to assassinate Nixon and started to stalk him and follow his movements via news outlets. He planned to do so by hijacking an airliner and crashing it into the White House on a day when Nixon would be there. It has been suggested (for instance, by the 2004 film dramatization of his life) that Byck was inspired by news reports of the buzzing of the White House by U.S. Army soldier Robert K. Preston in a stolen UH-1B Huey helicopter on February 17.

Since Byck was already known to the Secret Service and because legal attempts to purchase a firearm might have resulted in increased scrutiny, Byck stole a .22 caliber revolver from his friend to use in the hijacking. Byck also made a bomb out of two gallon jugs of gasoline and an igniter. All through this process, Byck made audio recordings explaining his motives and his plans; he expected to be considered a hero for his actions and wanted to fully document his reasons for the assassination.

On Friday morning, February 22, 1974, Byck drove to the Baltimore/Washington International Airport. Shortly after 7:00 a.m. EST, he shot and killed Maryland Aviation Administration policeman George Neal Ramsburg before storming a DC-9, Delta Air Lines Flight 523 to Atlanta, which he chose because it was the closest flight that was ready to take off. Pilots Reese (Doug) Loftin and Fred Jones immediately complied with Byck's orders and calmly tried to reassure him that they would cooperate, then Loftin told Byck they could not take off with the doors to the aircraft open and then alerted the control tower and summoned police assistance while Byck left to close them. After the pilots told him they could not take off until wheel blocks were removed, he shot them both and grabbed a nearby passenger, ordering her to "fly the plane". Jones died as he was being removed from the aircraft after the event was concluded; Loftin survived the attack. Byck told a flight attendant to close the door, or he would blow up the plane. Anne Arundel County policemen attempted to shoot out the tires of the aircraft to prevent its take-off, but the .38 caliber bullets fired from their police-issued Smith & Wesson revolvers failed to penetrate the aircraft's tires and ricocheted off, some hitting the wing of the plane.

After a standoff between Byck and police on the jetway, Anne Arundel County police officer Charles Troyer fired four shots through the aircraft door at Byck with a .357 Magnum revolver taken from the deceased Ramsburg. Two of the shots penetrated the thick window of the aircraft door and wounded Byck; before the police could gain entry to the plane, Byck committed suicide by shooting himself in the head.

According to a special on the History Channel, he lived for a few minutes, dying after saying "help me" to one of the policemen who entered the plane after he had been shot. A briefcase containing the gasoline bomb was found under his body. The plane never left the gate, and Nixon's schedule was not affected by the assassination attempt, although he was in the White House at the time.

It was subsequently discovered that Byck had sent a tape recording detailing his plan, which he called "Operation Pandora's Box", to news columnist Jack Anderson. A review of records disclosed that Byck had been arrested twice for protesting in front of the White House without a permit, and that he later dressed in a Santa Claus suit for another protest. Loftin, the flight's captain, recovered and resumed flying airliners several years later.

In 1987, an FAA document entitled "Troubled Passage: The Federal Aviation Administration During the Nixon–Ford Term 1973–1977" was produced, which mentioned Byck's failed hijacking: "...though Byck lacked the skill and self-control to reach his target, he had provided a chilling reminder of the potential of violence against civil aviation. Under a more relaxed security system, his suicidal rampage might have begun when the airliner was aloft."

Legacy 
Byck was buried at the Mount Jacob Cemetery in Glenolden, Pennsylvania.

After Byck's failed assassination attempt and subsequent death, he faded into relative obscurity except among members of security organizations; however, one of the long-term consequences of Byck's failed kidnapping was that it helped spur, along with several other failed and successful hijackings, the implementation of new security measures for airlines and airports.

The 9/11 Commission Report mentioned Byck's attempted assassination of Nixon on page 561 in note 21:

In popular culture 
Byck is one of the (failed) assassins portrayed in Stephen Sondheim's and John Weidman's 1991 musical Assassins.  His role in the musical is built largely around his tapes sent to Leonard Bernstein and other famous public figures, which he is depicted recording during two scene-length monologues, the first addressed to Bernstein and the second to Nixon himself. Byck also wears a Santa Claus suit throughout the play in reference to an incident where he did so while protesting Nixon on Christmas Day in 1973.

A film based on his story, The Assassination of Richard Nixon, was released in 2004. The film starred Sean Penn as Bicke (the surname spelling having been changed).

The History Channel also ran a special on Byck entitled The Plot to Kill Nixon.

References 

1930 births
1974 deaths
Hijackers
Jewish American military personnel
American murderers
Failed assassins of presidents of the United States
Military personnel from Philadelphia
American salespeople
Suicides by firearm in Maryland
United States Army soldiers
Delta Air Lines accidents and incidents
American failed assassins
Aviation accidents and incidents in the United States in 1974
20th-century American politicians
February 1974 events in the United States
1974 suicides
20th-century American Jews